Jean-Marc Roubaud (born 18 June 1951 in Algiers) is a member of the National Assembly of France.  He represents the Gard department,  and is a member of the Union for a Popular Movement.

References

1951 births
Living people
People from Algiers
People of French Algeria
Pieds-Noirs
Rally for the Republic politicians
Union for a Popular Movement politicians
The Popular Right
Deputies of the 12th National Assembly of the French Fifth Republic
Deputies of the 13th National Assembly of the French Fifth Republic